The Central Andean wet puna is a montane grasslands and shrublands ecoregion in the Andes of Peru and Bolivia.

Setting
This ecoregion occurs above  and consists of high-elevation, wet, montane grasslands amid lakes, plateaus, valleys, and high mountains. It is bordered on the west by the Sechura Desert and on the east by the Peruvian Yungas. To the north it transitions to the Cordillera Central páramo, to the south, the Central Andean puna.

The ecoregion can be subdivided into three subregions: the high andean puna, wet puna, and wet montane grassland.

It is wetter in the north, where the wet season lasts eight months, and drier in the south, where the wet season lasts two months. Night freezes occur from March to October.

They form in deep mountain valleys with glacial origins. They are more humid than the puna.

Climate
The climate varies between cold semi-arid and subtropical highland.

Flora
The vegetation is composed of bunchgrass communities, wetlands, small shrubs and trees, and herbaceous plants. 

Conspicuous grass genera include: Agrostis, Calamagrostis, Festuca, Paspalum and Stipa; in more humid areas Chusquea and Cortaderia. 

Asteraceae include Azorella, Baccharis, Daucus, Draba, Echinopsis, Gentiana, Geranium, Lupinus, Nototriche, Plettekea, Valeriana and Werneria.

Brassicaceae include Cardamine, Draba, and Weberbauera.

Campanulaceae include Lysipomia.

Caryophyllaceae include Arenaria, Cerstium, and Pycnophyllum.

Rosaceae include Acaena, Alchemilla, and Potentilla.

Rubiaceae include Arcytophyllum, and Galium.

Scrophulariaceae include Agalinis, Bartsia, and Calceolaria.

The high Andean puna includes species of grasses such as Festuca dolichopylla, Stipa ichu, Calamagrostis spp. Other plants with prostrate and roseate life forms are Alchemilla (syn. Lachemilla) spp., Hypochaeris spp.,  Pycnophyllum spp., Azorella spp., and Aciachne pulvinata.

The wet puna is composed mostly of grasses and shrubs, with sedges and rushes in areas with poor drainage. Below , vegetation in wet areas includes Carex, Juncus, Oreobolus and Scirpus. Above , the vegetation in wet areas (called bofedales) includes floating submerged cushion plants. Large cushions are formed by Distichia muscoides, Oxychloe andina, and Plantago rigida. Other genera include Gentiana, Hypsela, Isoetes, Lilaeopsis, Ourisia, and Scirpus. Common trees are Buddleja coriacea and Polylepis spp. Puya raimondii is a giant rosette found here.

The wet montane grasslands in the region possess species not found in the wet puna. These include Gnaphalium spp. Blechnum loxense, Loricaria sp., and Achirocline sp.

Fauna
All of the Andean camelids are found in this ecoregion, including the vicuña (Vicugna vicugna), llama (Lama glama), guanaco (Lama guanacoe), and alpaca (Lama pacos). Other large mammals include the puma (Felis concolor) and the andean fox (Pseudalopex culpaeus). Bats include the small big-eared brown bat (Histiotus montanus) and the hoary bat (Lasiurus cinereus).

Endemic bird species in the northern section of the ecoregion include the Ash-breasted tit-tyrant (Anairetes alpinus), the royal cinclodes (Cinclodes aricomae), Berlepsch’s canastero (Asthenes berlepschi), the line-fronted canastero (Asthenes urubambensis), the olivaceous thornbill (Chalcostigma olivaceum), the scribble-tailed canastero (Asthenes maculicauda), the short-tailed finch (Idiopsar bracyurus), and the gray-bellied flower-piercer (Diglosa carbonaria).

Endemic bird species found in the southern section of the ecoregion tend to live in dense montane scrub and shrubby forest with cacti. Most of these birds live in the puna region, but others live in subtropical and temperate zones. These include the plain-tailed warbling-finch (Poospiza alticola), the rufous-breasted warbling-finch (Poospiza rubecula), Taczanowski’s tinamou (Nothoprocta tacaznowskii), the white-cheeked cotinga (Zaratornis stresemanni), Kalinowski’s tinamou (Nothoprocta kalinowskii), the white-browed tit-spinetail (Leptasthenura xenothorax), the rufous-eared brush-finch (Atlapetes rufigenis), the white-tufted sunbeam (Aglaeactis castelnaudii), the bearded mountaineer (Oreonympha nobilis), the striated earthcreeper (Upucerthia serrana), the rusty-fronted canastero (Asthenes ottonis), the rusty-bellied brush-finch (Atlapetes nationi), the chesnut-breasted mountain-finch (Poospiza caesar), and the brown-flanked tanager (Thlypopsis pectoralis).

The southern section of the ecoregion includes the Cochabamba mountain-finch (Poospiza garleppi), Berlepsch’s canastero (Asthenes berlepschi), the maquis canastero (Astenes heterura), the rufous-bellied saltator (Saltator rufiventris), the citron-headed yellow-finch (Sicalis luteocephala), the scribble-tailed canastero (Asthenes maculicauda), the short-tailed finch (Idiopsar brachyurus), the grey-bellied flower-piecer (Diglossa carbonaria), and Berlepsch's canastero (Asthenes berlepschi).

Natural areas
Ulla Ulla National Reserve
Titicaca National Reserve
Nor Yauyos-Cochas Landscape Reserve
Historic Sanctuary of Machu Picchu
Huayhuash mountain range
Junín National Reserve
Huascarán National Park

References

Ecoregions of the Andes
Tropical Andes
Ecoregions of Peru
Ecoregions of Bolivia